The term Vaginitis emphysematosa is related to Women's Reproductive Health and  coined by Zweifel in 1877. The cases of Vaginitis emphysematosa are rare. The most important thing is that women never consult with the doctors for particularly Vaginitis emphysematosa but when they visit a doctor for some other reproductive health issue, they diagnose with the Vaginitis emphysematosa fortunately. Vaginitis emphysematosa is not common and Gynaecologists rarely know about it. Basically, this is characterised by gas-filled cysts in the mucosa of the vagina. Vaginitis emphysematosa is usually a self limited cystic disorder of the vagina. It is a very rare condition and has not much specific features to arouse clinical suspicion.

The term ''Vaginitis emphysematosa'' has 'vaginitis' in it but it has been observed that inflammation is generally mild and absent. This is characterised by gas-filled cysts in the vaginal wall and does not imply life-threatening infection.

Symptoms  and signs
Vaginitis emphysematosa occurs primarily in pregnant women, but there are some cases of non-pregnant women too. It is a rare, benign vaginal cyst identified in 173 cases. Women that have been affected were 42 to 65 years old. The cysts appear grouped but defined from one another, smooth, and can be as large as 2 cm. Symptoms included: vaginal discharge, itching, sensation of pressure, appearance of nodules, and sometimes a "popping sound".

Causes 
The cause is unknown. Histological examination showed the cysts contained pink hyaline-like material, foreign body-type giant cells in the cyst's wall, with chronic inflammatory cell fluid. The gas-filled cysts are identified with CT imaging. The gas contained in the cysts has been analysed and consists of nitrogen, oxygen, argon, carbon dioxide, and sulphur dioxide. Treatment may not be required and no complications follow the resolution of the cysts. It may be associated with immunosuppression, trichomonas, or Haemophilus vaginalis infection. Vaginitis emphysematous is characterized by gas-filled cysts in the vaginal wall.

See also 

 Vaginal cysts
 Vaginal tumours
 Female reproductive system Vaginitis
 Female reproductive system#Vulva

References 

 
Human female reproductive system
Women's health
Anatomy
Gynaecology
Cysts
Noninflammatory disorders of female genital tract